Dawn Okoro (born 1980, in Houston), is a Nigerian American artist who paints figurative art works, as well as practices photography and videography, all inspired by fashion and popular culture. She graduated from University of Texas-Austin in 2002 with a B.A. in Psychology and Fashion Design and graduated with a law degree from the Thurgood Marshall School of Law at Texas Southern University in 2009. 

Okoro currently lives and works in Austin, Texas, but her work has been exhibited throughout the United States and internationally, and has also been commissioned by celebrities.

Biography 
Born to an American mother and a Nigerian father from the Igbo tribe, Okoro was raised in Lubbock. 

Okoro has participated in both solo and group exhibitions throughout her career.

In 2008, Dawn's art works headlined Visual Collaborative's Miami exhibition. In June 2019, she returned as a feature on the platform, under the Voyager series for humanities, she was interviewed alongside 25 people from around the world such as; Seun Kuti, Berla Mundi and Aya Chebbi.

Since 2012, Dawn Okoro has split her time as both an artist and digital producer at Spectrum News Austin.

References

External links
Dawn Okoro. Additional information about Dawn Okoro, including art works, and articles.

1980 births
Living people
Igbo painters
American women painters
21st-century American women artists